Mount Augusta can refer to:
Mount Augusta, a mountain in the Saint Elias Mountains along the border of Alaska, United States and Yukon Territory, Canada.
Mount Augusta (Antarctica), a mountain in the Queen Alexandra Range of Antarctica.
Mount Augusta (Nevada), a mountain in Churchill County, Nevada.